Stechlin is a municipality in the Oberhavel district, in Brandenburg, Germany.

Geography 
Stechlin is part of the northern border of Brandenburg, at the start of the Mecklenburg Lake District. It is part of the Stechlin-Ruppiner Land Nature Park, surrounded by the Menzer Forest and has many lakes in the area. The most famous is Lake Stechlin (Stechlinsee) which is a protected area.

Districts of Stechlin
 Dagow
 Dollgow
 Güldenhof
 Menz
 Neuglobsow
 Neuroofen
 Schulzenhof

Demography

District Authority 
Stechlin is in the borough of Gransee. Stechlin has its own council that is responsible for 3 districts:
 Dollgow with Schulzenhof and Güldenhof
 Neuglobsow with Dagow
 Menz with Neuroofen

See also 
 Roofensee

References 

Localities in Oberhavel